The Madison House (or Madison's House) is a mansion located in Kincardine, Ontario. It has been named as one of Canada's most haunted places. 

The house, at 343 Durham Market Square, is Second Empire with elements of Italianate style, and was listed as a historic place in 1985 by the Kincardine government.

History
The house is one of the oldest standing buildings in Kincardine, ON (after Paddy Walker House).

It was built in the 1870s by Thomas C. Rooklidge, and was bought in 1886 by John Gentles, a liveryman and horse dealer.

Building Features 
Built in 1877, the mansion is 9250 sq.ft. and three stories tall.  The Madison House was originally constructed as a single family home but has been used for retail shops, restaurants, offices and even a funeral home. 

Today, the main floor consists of commercial space and the upper levels includes a 2 storey, 3 bedroom apartment and two 2 bedroom apartments.

Haunted

The Madison House is said to have had many violent and unfortunate deaths, although there is no evidence to support the claim  taken place with the spirits of the dead still there. Currently Madison House is used as apartments and there have been no claims of the building being haunted. Claims of being haunted may have been fabricated to support an attempted business as a 'haunted inn'.

The house was featured on YTV's "Ghost Trackers" season finale.

Tenants 
 Funeral Home  
 Peaches By The Park (Restaurant)  
 Madison's Haunted Inn  
 Photography Studio  
 Jan Johnstone For Huron-Bruce Campaign 
Office

References

Houses in Ontario
Buildings and structures in Bruce County
History of Bruce County
Designated heritage properties in Ontario